

Teams

League table

External links 
 Saudi Arabia Football Federation
 Saudi League Statistics
 goalzz

Saudi First Division League seasons
Saudi
2011–12 in Saudi Arabian football